The Webster County School District is a public school district in Webster County, Georgia, United States, based in Preston. It serves the communities of Preston and Weston.

Schools
The Webster County School District has one elementary-middle school and one high school.

Elementary-Middle school
Webster County Elementary/Middle School

High school
Webster County High School

References

External links

School districts in Georgia (U.S. state)
Education in Webster County, Georgia